The Weather Channel (TWC) is an American pay television channel owned by Weather Group, LLC, a subsidiary of Allen Media Group and The Weather Co. The channel's headquarters are in Atlanta, Georgia. Launched on May 2, 1982, the channel broadcasts weather forecasts and weather-related news and analysis, along with documentaries and entertainment programming related to weather. A sister network, Weatherscan, was a digital cable and satellite service that offered 24-hour automated local forecasts and radar imagery. Weatherscan was officially shut down on December 9, 2022. The Weather Channel also produces outsourced weathercasts, notably for CBS News and RFD-TV.

The Weather Channel was a subsidiary of the Weather Company until the latter was partially bought by IBM in 2016. The Weather Channel licenses its weather data from IBM, and as a result, the Weather Channel is now a joint venture between the two.

History

The Weather Channel was founded on July 18, 1980, by television meteorologist John Coleman (who had served as a chief meteorologist at ABC owned-and-operated station WLS-TV in Chicago and as a forecaster for Good Morning America) and Frank Batten, then-president of the channel's original owner Landmark Communications (now Landmark Media Enterprises). The channel launched at 8:00 p.m. Eastern Time on May 2, 1982. Originally, regional and local information was obtained from the National Weather Service for broadcast.  Since 2002, all forecasting has been done on-site in Atlanta.

Sale to NBCUniversal, Bain, and Blackstone 
On January 3, 2008, Landmark Communications put the Weather Channel and its assets up for sale. On July 6, 2008, NBC Universal, Bain Capital and Blackstone Group agreed to jointly purchase the Weather Channel from Landmark, making it the channel's first ownership change in 26 years. The sale was finalized on September 12, 2008.

NBC Universal also owned NBC Weather Plus, a rival service which was carried by and featured content from the NBC television network's local network affiliates; that service announced its discontinuation three months later. Over-the-air digital subchannels carrying Weather Plus have since switched to the similarly formatted The Local AccuWeather Channel, kept the Weather Plus engine, or switched affiliations to other networks such as This TV or the Retro Television Network; some have shut down entirely.

From November 2008 to February 2009, the Weather Channel laid off seven long-time on-camera meteorologists: Kristina Abernathy, Eboni Deon, Kristin Dodd, Rich Johnson, Cheryl Lemke, Mark Mancuso and Dave Schwartz (Schwartz would return to TWC in April 2014, but died of cancer on July 30, 2016). With the exception of Deon, all had been on the air for more than ten years, and three of them had been employed by the network for more than twenty years.

In July 2010, the Weather Channel terminated Bill Keneely, the last of the original on-camera meteorologists who appeared on the network's first broadcasts in 1982. In December of that year, the network also laid off on-camera meteorologist Nicole Mitchell, who later would file a lawsuit against the Weather Channel in 2012, alleging that she had been terminated because the channel's new owners disapproved of the time required by her simultaneous duties as a Captain in the U.S. Air Force Reserve as one of the "Hurricane Hunters" team; such reserve duties are protected by U.S. law (Mitchell later served as the chief meteorologist at Al Jazeera America, which for a time also employed Eboni Deon).

Inevitably, the merger of NBC on-air meteorologists began in May 2009. Former NBC Weather Plus meteorologist Todd Santos joined the Weather Channel on May 2 of that year. Al Roker of NBC's Today began hosting a one-hour morning program called Wake Up With Al, alongside meteorologist Stephanie Abrams later in the summer.

However, for New York City-based forecasting operations (those utilized for forecasts on MSNBC and CNBC, for instance), the former NBC Weather Plus forecasting, radar and graphics systems remain in place, with banners changed to fit the Weather Channel's graphics scheme. On September 10, 2009, the Weather Channel co-founder Frank Batten died.

2012 to 2018 
In January 2012, David Kenny took over as chief executive officer of the Weather Channel, replacing former AOL executive Mike Kelly, who had been appointed as the company's CEO in the summer of 2009. Although all operations, sales support and marketing and the bulk of employees are located in the headquarters in Atlanta, Kenny declined to move there, and continues to live  in Boston as a remote worker.

Later in 2012, the Weather Channel's holding company changed its name from The Weather Channel Companies to The Weather Company. The company also purchased competing weather service and website Weather Underground the same year. On March 10, 2015, Verizon FiOS dropped the Weather Channel and WeatherScan for their rival AccuWeather.

On September 9, 2015, the channel announced a phased overhaul of its programming schedule during 2016, in which the channel would gradually shift its focus back towards a forecast-based lineup. The channel cancelled Wake Up with Al, citing high production costs in New York City compared to Atlanta. It announced that AMHQ would be refocused on weather, eliminating lifestyle segments, with Stephanie Abrams becoming host and original host Sam Champion as a contributor for its prime time schedule starting November 2.

The network also announced it would no longer greenlight original long-form programming, and expanded live forecast programming on its schedule throughout 2016 after all remaining long-form programs already in development concluded their runs. In a memo sent out to network staff by Weather Company CEO David Kenny, it explained its refocus on weather-based programs was done so that "our most passionate fans come to us for the weather and the science behind the weather, not our original shows." Around 50 TWC employees – including production, engineering, and financial staff – were laid off, and the television channel's budget was reduced to shift resources to the company's Internet and mobile properties.

The channel's original format was similar to that of a news and information cable network. Since the creation of the series Atmospheres in 2000 and Storm Stories in 2003, the Weather Channel had seen a gradual transition toward a mix of weather forecasting and weather-related entertainment programming that paralleled the launch of sister network Weatherscan, the evolution of the always-on "L" bar/weather ticker, the development of weather.com and popular branded mobile phone applications, and the increased viewing and interest in documentary programs on the topic of weather.

In November 2013, the channel introduced a new initiative of "weather all the time" in response to the criticism. All original programming – which was rebranded under the tagline Natural Drama – now had direct relevance to weather-related subjects, and the network emphasized its promise to interrupt original programming either regionally or nationally during major weather events. In addition, the Weather Channel extended the display of its lower display line (which was  revamped with a new graphics package) to commercial breaks and through entire broadcasts of its original programs.

In August 2015, reports surfaced that the Weather Company's owners were considering a sale of all or part of the venture, having hired Morgan Stanley and PJT Partners to explore their options. On October 28, 2015, it was announced that IBM would acquire most of the Weather Company's assets, including weather.com, Weather Underground, the related mobile applications, and their underlying data platforms, for an undisclosed amount.

IBM planned to leverage its Watson technology as part of the acquisition, foreseeing its use for weather analytics and predictions. The deal, which closed the following January, does not include the Weather Channel itself, which remained owned by the Bain/Blackstone/NBCUniversal consortium, and entered into a long-term licensing agreement with IBM for use of its weather data and "The Weather Channel" name and branding.

Sale to Entertainment Studios 

In August 2016, reports surfaced that Sinclair Broadcast Group had expressed interest in acquiring ownership of the Weather Channel.

On March 22, 2018, Byron Allen's Entertainment Studios announced its acquisition of the Weather Channel's television assets from the NBCUniversal/Bain/Blackstone partnership. The actual value is undisclosed, but was reported to be around $300 million.  The channel's non-television assets, which were separately sold to IBM two years prior, were not included in the sale.

In the early morning of April 18, 2019, the Weather Channel was temporarily unable to air live programming due to what they called a "malicious software attack" on their network. Previously taped shows were aired while engineers worked with backup equipment, and live programming returned to normal within a few hours (at the time, AMHQ). As of May 2019, the investigation into the malware attack was still active.

In May 2022, on The Weather Channel's 40th birthday, it launched a new direct-to-consumer subscription-based app.

International versions 
Over the years, attempts to broadcast international versions of TWC – apart from the Australian version of the Weather Channel (now Sky News Weather Channel) – have failed. TWC operates websites that provide localized forecasts in Brazil, France, Germany, India, Latin America and the United Kingdom, but some of these sites may not have developed since 2003. The Weather Channel shares radar imagery and forecasts with the Weather Network in Canada, particularly for the Weather Channel's Canadian forecasts.
 A U.K. version of the Weather Channel operated from September 1, 1996, to January 30, 1998, when it was shut down due to low viewership. On satellite, it broadcast for five hours each day, from 6am until 11am. It shared channel space with Sky Movies Gold/Sky Box Office 2, The Racing Channel and Galavision. On cable, it was generally on air for 24 hours but it was only carried by some companies as others chose to carry rival service The Weather Network which also launched in the UK in 1996. Both were designed for cable as it had local weather information for specific regions.
 TWC formerly operated the Weather Channel Latin America, a Spanish-language network serving Mexico, Puerto Rico and South America. This network launched in 1996 and an accompanying Brazilian Portuguese-language feed launched in 1998. It ceased operations on December 20, 2002, due to budget cuts. The channel's three original on-camera weather presenters were Paola Elorza, Sal Morales, and Mari Carmen Ramos; all three left the channel within a year of its launch and respectively went on to work for Univision in Miami, Telemundo in Los Angeles, and CNN International in Atlanta.

Ratings and reception 
, the Weather Channel was received by approximately 79.128 million households that subscribe to a pay television service throughout the United States. Americans regard the Weather Channel as the most trustworthy media organization, according to a 2022 poll by The Economist and YouGov.

Local on the 8s

Related services

Television

Radio and newspaper presence
The Weather Channel provides forecasts for satellite radio provider Sirius XM Radio in the United States. Both services run regional forecasts on a single station, and operate several individual stations providing combined local weather and traffic information for major metropolitan areas.

The Weather Channel also simulcast on SiriusXM from 2016 onward during the following storms:

2016 

 Hurricane Matthew

2017 

 March 2017 North American blizzard
 Hurricane Harvey
 Hurricane Irma

2018 

 Hurricane Florence
 Hurricane Michael

2019 

 Hurricane Dorian

2020 

 Hurricane Isaias
 Hurricane Laura
 Hurricane Sally
 Hurricane Delta
 Hurricane Zeta

2021
 Hurricane Ida

TWC also maintains content partnerships with a number of local U.S. radio stations to provide local forecasts, using announcers separate from the meteorologists seen on the television channel. For some affiliates, the Weather Channel provides a limited amount of live coverage during local severe weather events (with the Georgia-based announcers connected via ISDN). Distribution of TWC radio content is currently handled by Westwood One.

Similarly, the Weather Channel also provides weather reports for a number of newspapers around the United States. This included a half-page national forecast for USA Today, for which TWC provided content until September 2012, when rival AccuWeather replaced the Weather Channel as the paper's forecast provider.

2022 
On March 28, 2022, TWC announced a content partnership with CBS News, under which it will provide weather reports on CBS Mornings, the CBS Evening News, and the CBS News streaming network, as well as collaborate on investigative journalism relating to weather and climate.

On May 2, 2022, The Weather Channel en Español launched on Local Now as TWC celebrates their 40th anniversary. TWC en Español has 24/7 coverage. Milmar Ramírez, Henry Golac, Jessica Fernández, Lorena Lim, Albert Martínez and Abel Hernández leads the team.

Online services

TWC provided numerous customized forecasts for online users through its website, weather.com, including home and garden, and event planning forecasts. Third-party web analytics providers Alexa and SimilarWeb rated the site as the 146th and 244th most visited website in the world respectively, as of July 2015. SimilarWeb rates the site as the second most visited weather website globally, attracting more than 126 million visitors per month.

It also provided WAP access for mobile phone users, desktop widgets for quick reference by computer users, and customized weather feeds for individual websites. Cell phone customers could also receive local forecasts from TWC sent to their mobile handsets via SMS by sending a text message with their ZIP code to 42278 (which spells "4cast"). The Weather Channel also provided weather forecasts for other online services including Yahoo!.

In addition, The Weather Channel maintained apps for the iPhone, iPad, Android, Apple TV, Kindle Fire, and Windows mobile and tablet platforms. TWC formerly maintained two versions of its mobile applications: a free version that incorporates advertising and a pay version called "TWC Max" that does not feature advertising, the latter was discontinued in favor of an all ad-supported model on January 6, 2014. Aside from location-based weather forecast information, the apps provided radar maps, and tropical and seasonal updates, as well as social media related functions that track weather-related Twitter messages and allow users to send Facebook friends severe weather alerts. The channel also disseminated severe weather information, and photos and videos submitted by meteorologists and viewers, on its Twitter feed (@TWCBreaking, which also served as a hashtag usable for posts).

In July 2012, the Weather Company (former owner of the Weather Channel) purchased competing weather website Weather Underground. While the Weather Channel already had success with its own mobile apps, it planned to use Weather Underground's large network of digital forecasting and tracking websites to bolster its digital growth. Weather Underground operates separately from the Weather Channel and continues to provide its own forecasts, though its website incorporates some weather news and video content from TWC.

The website weather.com and most of the Weather Channel's digital assets were sold to IBM in January 2016. The Weather Channel as a television operation now uses weloveweather.tv.

Programming

Weather forecast programming made up TWC's entire schedule prior to its incorporation of weather-related original programming – referred in network promotional materials and press releases as "long-form programming" – in 2000 (with few breakaways from its forecast programs prior to then, outside of educational program The Weather Classroom, an original program produced as part of the cable television industry's Cable in the Classroom initiative). The number of hours devoted to TWC's in-studio forecast programs have steadily eroded since then. The network's live studio programs are aired regularly from 6:00 a.m. to 8:00 p.m. Eastern Time on weekdays and from 6:00 a.m. to 1:00 p.m. Eastern Time on weekends and holidays. America's Morning Headquarters airs weekdays between 6:00 a.m. and noon  Eastern Time, followed by Pattrn, which airs from noon to 1:00 p.m. Eastern, Weather Underground, which airs from 1:00 p.m. to 5:00 p.m. Eastern followed by the network's drivetime program, Storm Center, which airs from 5:00 p.m. to 8:00 p.m. Eastern. On weekends, America's Weekend Headquarters from 6:00 a.m. to 9:00 a.m., followed by Weekend Recharge from 9:00 a.m. to 1:00 p.m.

The Weather Channel also broadcast original weather-related documentary/entertainment series and specials. These programs ran throughout the rest of the schedule. During severe weather events affecting portions of the United States, the Weather Channel may preempt original programming in favor of airing extended coverage under the umbrella title Weather Center Live (which changes the color of the word "LIVE" from blue to red) to provide long-form coverage and analysis until its aftermath; in some events, the on-air graphics (including Lower Display Line) can go black-and-red (similar to colors that WCL uses); pre-emptions vary between local (isolated to viewers in the region affected by a particular weather event) and nationwide, depending upon the impact of the weather phenomenon/story and if a local provider utilizes a later model WeatherStar unit that allows the use of dual feeds that can substitute programming with long-form weather coverage in a given area. TWC normally utilizes a different music theme for these events, dubbed "Storm Alert Mode", used for both WCL and LOT8's.

Movies
In a move that caused controversy with many longtime viewers, the Weather Channel began airing weather-related movies on Friday nights on October 30, 2009. The first feature to be broadcast by the channel was the 2000 film The Perfect Storm.

After December 2009, these weekly movies were discontinued for the time being in favor of running Weather Center, which already aired throughout primetime during the rest of the work week. Despite the controversy, the Friday night film block resumed on March 26, 2010, under the title "Flick and a Forecast," co-hosted by the Weather Channel meteorologist Jen Carfagno and MSNBC contributor Touré, with the documentary Into Thin Air: Deaths on Everest. During the broadcasts, the Lower Display Line that normally appears on TWC shows to provide local weather information (with breakaways during forecast and most long-form programs only for commercial breaks) was removed, appearing only a few times each hour during the film as a substitute for the standard "Local on the 8s" segments, with a translucent TWC logo bug appearing at other times during the film when the LDL was not on-screen.

While the films shown within the "Flick and a Forecast" block were weather-related in some form, some films featured (such as Misery and Deep Blue Sea) had only a minimal tie to weather. On May 31, 2010, NewsBlues reported the Weather Channel's decision to cancel the movie block, due in part to viewer criticism of movies being shown on what is intended as a news and information channel, as well as a snafu that occurred during an April 2010 tornado outbreak that led to a scheduled movie being aired instead of wall-to-wall severe weather coverage. The "Flick and a Forecast" presentations were then replaced by an additional hour of Weather Center and a two-hour block of long-form original programs.

Notable current personalities

Reporters
 Dave Malkoff: Field / Feature reporter (2012–present)
 Carl Parker: On-Camera Meteorologist, Climate reporter, Storm specialist special coverage (1999–present)
 Mike Seidel: On-Camera Meteorologist, Field Meteorologist (1992–present)

Former personalities
 John Coleman: Founder of the Weather Channel; deceased
 John Hope: Meteorologist/hurricane expert 1982-2002; deceased
 Vivian Brown: 1986-2015
 Jeanetta Jones: 1986-2006; deceased
 Crystal Egger: 2010-2013; last with KNBC in Los Angeles
 Al Roker: 2009-2015; current co-host of Today
 Dave Schwartz: 1991-2008, 2014–2016; deceased
 Sam Champion: 2014–2016; now at WABC-TV in New York City
 Bob Stokes:  1996-2008
 Anaridis Rodriguez: 2014–2017; now at WBZ-TV
 Maria LaRosa: Weekend Recharge (2010–2018) now at WNBC in New York City
 Greg Forbes: 1999–2018
 Tom Niziol: 2012-2019, retired, former winter weather expert
 Rich Johnson: 1983-2009, 2016-2018
 Jennifer Lopez: 2004-2007, now with WSB-TV in Atlanta
 Alexandria Steele: 2005-2008, later with CNN, now with WANF in Atlanta
 Kait Parker: 2014-2016

Branding

Logos
The Weather Channel's first and most recognized logo was a blue rectangular box with rounded edges that debuted with the Weather Channel's first broadcast on May 2, 1982. This logo was revised in 1996, with the corners becoming less rounded and the logo becoming slightly flat. The weather.com URL text was permanently added underneath the logo in 1999. On August 15, 2005, the logo was overhauled again; the logo became a straight-edged square with no white trim on the edge and "The Weather Channel" text became oriented in title-case and left-justified, similar to its Canadian sister channel the Weather Network. A 25th-anniversary logo used in 2007 featured a white square edged in blue connected to the current logo with the text "25 YEARS" inside it in blue.

When NBCUniversal acquired the network in 2008, the network has participated in the "Green is Universal" campaign, which occurs twice a year, usually during April and November. The network's logo changes to a shade of green as part of the campaign promoting environmental conservation. Since 2014, the network has utilized a red-colored version of the logo during hurricane coverage; the red logo has also appeared during severe tornado outbreaks.

Slogans
 1982–1983: We Take the Weather Seriously, But Not Ourselves
 1983–1984: The Cable Television Network for America's Lifestyle
 1984–1986: Weatherproofing America
 1986–1991: You Need Us, the Weather Channel, for Everything You Do
 1991–1996: Weather You Can Always Turn To
 1996–1998: No Place on Earth Has Better Weather
 1998–2001: Keeping You Ahead of the Storm
 2001–2005: Live By It
 2005–2008: Bringing Weather to Life
 June 2–late 2008: The Weather Has Never Looked Better
 2009–early 2010: The Sounds of Weather. Hear It, See It, Live It
 2013–2020: It's Amazing Out There
 2015–2016: Where You Get Your Weather Matters
 2017–2018: Trust In Us To Be There
 2019-present: America's Most Trusted TV News Network (Current promotional campaign)
 2020–present: Get Into The Out There

Controversy

Cable and satellite carriage disputes

Dish Network carriage dispute
On May 20, 2010, Dish Network announced that it was dropping the Weather Channel at 12:00 a.m. Eastern Time that day in favor of its own similar weather information channel, the Weather Cast. The carriage dispute was over the rates that the Weather Channel asked Dish Network to pay: from 11¢ per subscriber per month to 12¢, a 9% increase, totaling $140,000 per month. The dispute was also over the Weather Channel's programming format shifting from an information-based channel to an entertainment-based service. The Weather Channel said in a statement, "Dish has chosen to be the first distributor to drop the Weather Channel rather than pay the standard industry rates others in the industry have already agreed to pay", and encouraged Dish Network customers to switch to other pay television providers. Dave Shull, senior vice president for programming for Dish Network said the Weather Channel's fees were harder for the satellite provider to justify paying as more people receive weather information through the internet and mobile services: "They're looking for bid increases when I feel like there's a real migration to the Web, and it's difficult to really justify those rate increases at this time."

On May 24, 2010, the Weather Channel announced that it had reached a new multi-year carriage agreement with Dish Network, the financial terms of which were not disclosed. Despite the earlier announcement that the Weather Channel would be dropped, the channel was never officially removed from Dish Network. The Weather Cast ceased operations in anticipation of the launch of a Weatherscan-based service announced as part of the agreement that would provide local weather information for Dish Network customers. The proposed movie scheduled for the Friday after the deal was struck (May 28), Gorillas in the Mist, was dropped in favor of a six-hour marathon of Tornado Road.

DirecTV carriage dispute
DirecTV removed the Weather Channel from its lineup on January 14, 2014, after the two parties were unable to come to terms on a new carriage agreement; as a result, DirecTV became the first major pay television provider to drop the channel in its history. Two weeks before the channel's carriage agreement was set to expire on December 31 (after which the deadline for a new carriage deal was extended by two weeks), the satellite provider began carrying WeatherNation TV (the successor to the Weather Cast and owned by WeatherNation, LLC) on channel 361 on December 16, 2013 – placing the channel next to the Weather Channel's slot on channel 362; WeatherNation replaced the Weather Channel on channel 362 – while still being carried on channel 361 – when TWC was pulled.

The Weather Channel's chief executive officer David Kenny stated that it offered DirecTV the best rate for its programming (according to SNL Kagan, the Weather Channel's average carriage fee at the time was 13¢ per subscriber), and blasted the satellite provider's removal of the channel by stating that it was putting profits ahead of public safety. Representatives for DirecTV stated that it added WeatherNation TV in response to subscriber complaints regarding the number of reality programs on the Weather Channel, which it estimated had amounted to 40% of its daily schedule (WeatherNation TV, which outside of its carriage by DirecTV is primarily carried on broadcast television stations as a main channel affiliation or a digital multicast service, does not run programming outside of forecasts with the only interruption in its weather coverage coming from affiliates that carry children's programs to fulfill FCC educational programming requirements; however, WeatherNation has been criticized for its very limited amount of live programming, which TWC does provide, especially during significant weather events). DirecTV stated that weather information is also available through broadcast television stations carried as part of its local channel tier, as well as the provider's designated emergency channels. The Weather Channel fought back by airing commercials encouraging people to not subscribe to DirecTV by parodying the provider's popular "Get Rid of Cable" ad campaign.

On April 8, 2014, the Weather Channel and DirecTV both settled on a new agreement (TWC decided to alter its programming lineup by trimming the amount of reality programming on weekdays in half, restricting them to its nighttime schedule, in response to complaints from DirecTV subscribers), with the provider restoring the channel on channel 362 the following day. Access to local weather content using the red button feature did not return until May 2, 2014.

Verizon FiOS removal and return
Verizon FiOS dropped the Weather Channel and its sister network Weatherscan from its lineup on March 10, 2015, after the two parties were unable to come to terms on a new carriage agreement. The services have respectively been replaced by the AccuWeather Network (which launched on March 10) and a widget provided by FiOS featuring forecast content provided by WeatherBug. No public announcement was made regarding the removal until over 12 hours after TWC and Weatherscan were pulled. The Weather Channel offered a less expensive deal to Verizon FiOS, which rejected the offer. Verizon cited the Weather Channel's frequent use of scare tactics, naming of winter storms and the wide availability of the internet and mobile apps for consumers to access weather content any time of day as the reason for dropping TWC and its services. It is unknown if Frontier FiOS customers in clusters formerly served by Verizon are affected, including (as of April 1, 2016) the recently acquired clusters from California, Texas, and Florida.

A representative for the network said in a statement, "We were disappointed when, without warning late yesterday, March 9, Verizon FiOS dropped the Weather Channel from their lineup while our companies continued to be in active conversations regarding a contract renewal. FiOS customers have enjoyed a bundle of services from the Weather Channel including the network, Weatherscan, On-Demand, a Weather Widget and streaming on mobile devices. During a winter with record-breaking storms and severe weather, the Weather Channel responded with non-stop live coverage, including the ongoing presence of our crews reporting live from hard-hit communities within the Verizon FiOS footprint. This coverage resulted in the Weather Channel being the only major cable network to grow in February."

The Weather Channel had earlier signed renewal agreements with major providers that are members of the National Cable Television Cooperative (NCTC), including Time Warner Cable and Cox Communications. However, representatives for the channel claimed to be shocked that "Verizon FiOS would deny their subscribers access to the best live weather coverage and expertise that only the Weather Channel can provide." While Verizon claimed it was a long-term business decision (instead of a carriage dispute) that it made, the Weather Channel launched a campaign, originally urging viewers to contact FiOS about restoring the cable channel and its services. But, seeing that Verizon is not planning on bringing the channel and its services back in the near future, the Weather Channel now urges its viewers to switch providers.

After a four-year absence and with the channel under ownership of Entertainment Studios, Verizon FiOS inked a new agreement to bring the Weather Channel back to its lineups on June 24, 2019. The channel has not yet returned to channel lineups within Frontier FiOS's customer footprint.

Winter storm naming

In the fall of 2012, the Weather Channel began to assign names to major winter storm systems. The channel stated the decision to start naming notable winter storms came as a way to more easily spread knowledge and raise awareness. By naming winter storms, TWC stated that the public would find it easier to follow storm information, social media will be able to refer to and discuss the storm, and people will have an easier time referring to the storm after it occurs. However, critics of the Weather Channel insist it is a way to further hype winter weather, especially on the heavily populated East Coast. Critics contend that (south of Boston), many other areas of the United States actually experience much more frequent and intense winter weather than the East Coast, but does not have as large of a media market.

The first winter storm to be named by TWC was a nor'easter that hit the East Coast of the United States in November 2012, which was named after the Greek goddess Athena. During the 2012–13 season, the Weather Channel named 27 winter storms (Athena, Brutus, Caesar, Draco, Euclid, Freyr, Gandolf, Helen, Iago, Jove, Khan, Luna, Magnus, Nemo, Orko, Plato, Q, Rocky, Saturn, Triton, Ukko, Virgil, Walda, Xerxes, Yogi, Zeus and Achilles). During the 2013–14 season, the Weather Channel named 26 winter storms (Atlas, Boreas, Cleon, Dion, Electra, Falco, Gemini, Hercules, Ion, Janus, Kronos, Leon, Maximus, Nika, Orion, Pax, Seneca, Titan, Ulysses, Vulcan, Wiley, Xenia, Yona and Zephyr). Multiple factors are taken into consideration when deciding whether to name a winter storm. This includes, but is not limited to, predicted snowfall and other precipitation, wind speeds, and the timing of the storm.

The Weather Channel has provided the criteria behind their decisions to name certain storms, in particular Athena, Brutus, Gandolf, Iago, Khan, Luna, Magnus, Nemo, Saturn, and Virgil.

In response, the National Weather Service announced on November 7, 2012, that it would not recognize the Weather Channel's names for winter storms, stating in a press release that it "does not use the name of winter storms in its products." Some commentators have suggested that naming winter storms may give them undue importance in the public eye by drawing parallels to official names given to tropical storms, which are significantly more severe and devastating than winter storms, by the National Weather Service. References to the names are generally limited on TWC-provided forecasts seen on NBC's news programs.

See also

 Weather media in the United States
 The Weather Network – A Canadian Category A cable and satellite channel devoted to weather forecasts.
 WeatherStar – A series of proprietary computer units installed at the head end of cable television providers that disseminate weather data.
 The Weather Company – The former parent company of the Weather Channel.
 The Weather Channel Presents: The Best of Smooth Jazz - the first jazz album released by the channel

References

External links

 
 

 
1982 meteorology
2018 mergers and acquisitions
American corporate subsidiaries
American news websites
Companies based in Cobb County, Georgia
English-language television stations in the United States
Entertainment Studios
Former Comcast subsidiaries
Former General Electric subsidiaries
Meteorological data and networks
Television channels and stations established in 1982
Television networks in the United States
Universal Windows Platform apps
Weather television networks